The Milan Triennial XVIII was the Triennial in Milan sanctioned by the Bureau of International Expositions (BIE), held at the  Palazzo dell'Arte in 1992.
Its theme was Life in Things and Nature: Design and the Environmental Challenge, was designed by Aldo Rossi, and curated by Angelo Cortesi.

References 

1992 in Italy
Tourist attractions in Milan
World's fairs in Milan